The men's doubles competition was one of two rackets events held as part of the Rackets at the 1908 Summer Olympics programme. Nations could enter up to 6 pairs (12 players), though only Great Britain competed with a total of 3 pairs (6 players).

Results

References

 
 

Men's doubles